Potomac Yard station is a Washington Metro station under construction in Alexandria, Virginia, United States. The station will be operated by the Washington Metropolitan Area Transit Authority (WMATA), serving both the Blue and Yellow Lines, and is expected to open in May 2023. The station will be located at Alexandria's planned  Potomac Yard mixed-use development bounded by Richmond Highway (U.S. Route 1) and the George Washington Memorial Parkway. Upon its completion, Potomac Yard will be the second infill station to be added to the Washington Metro system, after NoMa–Gallaudet U in 2004. Potomac Yard station is being constructed on the site of Potomac Yard, a former railroad freight yard.

History

Background

Plans to construct a Washington Metro station between the Braddock Road and Ronald Reagan Washington National Airport stations on the Blue and Yellow Lines have been proposed since the  Potomac Yard retail and residential redevelopment began in the late 1990s with the construction of the Potomac Yard Shopping Center. The area of Metrorail at Potomac Yard was originally constructed in a way to allow for a future station.

In June 2008, Alexandria's Planning Commission approved higher-density projects at a town center near the proposed Potomac Yard station site. The first official public meeting on the prospect of the Potomac Yard station was held on February 19, 2009, between Alexandria city officials and the Metrorail Station Feasibility Work Group in Alexandria City Hall.

On June 12, 2010, the Alexandria City Council voted to rezone the  North Potomac Yard area in an effort to convert the  big-box Potomac Yard Shopping Center into a  mixed-use development centered around the proposed station. Once the station is operational,  the development's final build-out will take place.

Estimated costs and financing
The estimation of costs for the construction of the Potomac Yard station increased from $150 million in February 2009 to a cost of $240 million in December 2010. Funding for the station's construction costs is to be partly provided by the city of Alexandria and the Washington Metropolitan Area Transit Authority with the bulk of the funding coming from property owners in close proximity to the station. CPYR, the owner of the Potomac Yard Shopping Center, will contribute $81 million, and the city of Alexandria will float about $275 million in bonds to pay for its portion. The addition of the station to the Blue and Yellow Lines will cost roughly $500,000 in fiscal 2010 dollars to operate annually. Alexandria city officials proposed two special tax districts that would supplement developer CPYR's contributions and tax increment financing to cover the cost of the $240 million Metro station and its debt service, totaling an estimated $496.6 million.

On December 18, 2010, the Alexandria City Council unanimously approved a package that funded a large portion of the construction and operations of the proposed Potomac Yard station through the creation of the city's first special tax district. In order to fund the proposed $240 million construction cost of the Potomac Yard station, the Alexandria City Council approved a 20-cent special tax district for the Potomac Yard development. The projected cost to build the Potomac Yard station and the debt servicing paid over a 30-year period will be approximately $500 million. The 20-cent special tax district approved by the council is scheduled to take effect January 1, 2011 on developments within Potomac Yard and will generate about $500,000 a year in new tax revenues. The revenue from the tax district will be added to developer contributions and a soft tax increment financing area to pay bond debt financing over a 30-year period.

A second tax district within Alexandria's Potomac Greens neighborhood had been proposed by the Alexandria City Council to aid in funding the Potomac Yard station's construction cost. Residents within the proposed tax district would have been taxed (after the station opened) 10 cents per $100 of assessed property value, generating approximately $185,000 a year. Alexandria city officials removed Potomac Greens from the second tax district in May 2011.

In January 2015, the city of Alexandria was lent $50 million from the Virginia state government toward the new station, which will cost between $209–264 million. In July 2016, the Northern Virginia Transportation Authority approved $66 million for the station.

Station site 
The City of Alexandria considered four alternatives for the site of the station:
 Alternative A: At-grade, with side platforms between the CSX railroad tracks and the north end of the Potomac Greens neighborhood. Cost of $209 million.
 Alternative B: At-grade, with side platforms between the George Washington Parkway and the CSX tracks, north of Potomac Greens and east of the existing Potomac Yard Retail Center and CSX right-of-way. Cost of $268 million.
 Alternative B-CSX: At the site of the Regal Potomac Yard movie theater. Cost of $351 million.
 Alternative D: Elevated, with a center platform west of the CSX right-of-way, near the existing Potomac Yard retail center. Cost of $493 million.

In April 2015, the city recommended Alternative B, because it was the option that would result in the most dense development. The City Council voted on the selection in May. As part of building the station, the city will receive  of land along the George Washington Parkway from the National Park Service, and in exchange transfer  of city parkland to the federal government and spend $12 million to improve the Mount Vernon Trail and Daingerfield Island. The station will have two pedestrian bridges over CSX tracks to the future development, and one pedestrian bridge to Potomac Greens and Old Town Greens. Funding will come from a local tax district, tax revenue from new development, $69 million from the Northern Virginia Transportation Authority, and $50 million from a developer.

Finalized plans

The Potomac Yard project planners had completed scoping and alternatives in 2011, and were to have completed a draft Environmental Impact Statement (EIS) by the end of 2013. Due to delays, the final EIS was not released until June 2016. The station, as originally planned, was supposed to open by 2016, but by January 2015 it was delayed until 2018. In November 2016 the National Park Service and Federal Highway Administration issued a Record of Decision in favor of the station's construction.

The WMATA board accepted the station into the system and endorsed the site choice in December 2015. , the station was expected to open in 2020.  , the station was expected to be open in 2021.

In April 2018, city officials in Alexandria said the station opening might be as late as 2022. Alexandria officials also raised the total cost of the station by $52 million, citing higher costs for labor and building materials. Because of this cost increase, the Potomac Yard station's proposed southern entrance at Glebe Road was canceled. However, after the construction of Amazon HQ2 was announced for the area in November 2018, the southern entrance was returned to the plans. It was planned to be completed in 2026 and cost an extra $50 million.

The official groundbreaking ceremony was held on December 19, 2019, with completion then expected for April 2022. By February 2022, construction was 70% complete, with the station expected to enter service that fall. A planned shutdown of all service to southern Yellow Line stations for maintenance work on the bridge and tunnel between the L'Enfant Plaza and Pentagon stations began on September 10, 2022, to connect Potomac Yard to the main rail system. Originally planned to end on October 22, it was extended to November 5 due to the discovery of soil conditions needing additional work. The opening of the station was also delayed to early 2023. In December 2022, with the station 90% complete, WMATA announced plans to open it in May 2023.

References

External links 
Potomac Yard Metrorail Station Environmental Impact Statement (EIS)
Potomac Yard Metrorail Station Feasibility Work Group
Potomac Yard Planning Advisory Group
Potomac Yard Metrorail Station TIIF Allocation (February 26, 2009)
Final Potomac Yard Metrorail Station Concept Development Study (February 3, 2010)

Stations on the Blue Line (Washington Metro)
Proposed Washington Metro stations
Stations on the Yellow Line (Washington Metro)
Transportation in Alexandria, Virginia
Proposed public transportation in Virginia
Railway stations scheduled to open in 2023